"Suddenly" is a song by Sean Maguire, released as the third single from his first album, Sean Maguire. It reached number 18 and spent five weeks in the UK Singles Chart.

Track listing
 CD1
"Suddenly"
"You Help Me See The Light"
"Suddenly" (Tom Frederikse Extended Mix)
"Suddenly" (Gary Stevenson Mix)

 CD2
"Suddenly"
"Stay"
"Suddenly" (Love To Infinity Mix)
"Suddenly" (Love To Infinity Extended Mix)

Charts

References

1995 singles
Sean Maguire songs
1995 songs
Parlophone singles